Brewster School District can mean:

 Rural school districts in Washington#Brewster School District
 Brewster School District, Minnesota.